In sports and games, foul line can refer to
baseball's foul lines
basketball's free throw line
table shuffleboard's foul line
ten-pin bowling's foul line
the similar line in candlepin bowling
the foul line for the long jump